The Dorset Militia (also titled Dorsetshire Militia) was a county Militia  regiment of the British Army that was in existence from 1757 to 1881.

Purpose
The militias that were listed in the army of Queen Victoria were those units created by the Militia Act of 1757. In 1881, the British army was reorganised and militia regiments were then directly associated with county regiments of the regular army (losing their unique status), adopting their county regiment's name and battalion numbering system. In 1908 they would designated Special Reserve battalions. The purpose of these units was to act as a territorially based force of able-bodied men to serve in Dorset and in time of war would report for duty such as defending against invasion by the French. They were not supposed to serve overseas, although the county militias acted as feeder units for officers and recruits to the regular army in times of need.

In the case although militias had been complete throughout England, it was in 1794 that greater emphasis was put on the defensive value, particularly in the coastal regions of the kingdom. This was the period in our history that the French would be so much our implacable foe, Napoleon Bonaparte's power grew in Europe.

However, in 1798 the Dorset  did deploy to assist in a force suppressing a French-supported rebellion in southern Ireland; along with its neighbouring militia from Devon.

Insignia
Examples of the Dorset Militia cap badge are not common and where they do exist they appear to be of a standard Victorian Shako Plate with a crown an facetted eight-pointed star, with a central motif of an ornate numeral one surrounded by a belted title bearing the title "Dorset Militia", or in the case of the Glengarry badge a centre with the Gibraltar castle with motto Primus In Indis (First in India) and a circlet with "Dorsetshire" inscribed.

Unit history
There are records from the 16th Century that the counties of Dorset, Devon and Cornwall were of special interest in terms defending against invasion; and the Duke of Bedford was charged as Lord Lieutenant to compile lists of what indigenous supplies of men, horses and fighting equipment could be mustered as local militia. The Dorset Militia was formally raised in 1757 and 1758 due to the threat of French invasion during the Seven Years' War. The militia served duty on the coast although no attack ever came.

Members of the local Dorset gentry joined the militia and a number were painted in their uniforms, notably:

 Colonel David Robert Michel painted by Thomas Gainsborough circa 1760
 Lieutenant Sir Gerard Napier painted by Joshua Reynolds circa 1762
 Colonel George Pitt, First Lord Rivers painted by Thomas Gainsborough circa 1768; and then by Thomas Beach circa 1780 and Thomas Gooch circa 1782

The Dorset Militia was again raised in force in 1776 due to the majority of the regular British forces leaving to fight in the American Revolution, and thus the militia was needed to man the local garrisons. The militias were called out on active service during the Armada of 1779, and the Dorset men were tasked with building defenses on the coastline.

On 22 August 1798 a force of 1,100 French soldiers landed in County Mayo to support the Irish Rebellion. The Churchwarden accounts for Fordington, Dorset show that the Dorset Militia were embarked for Ireland on 31 August 1798. They were still in transit when a decisive battle took place at Ballinamuck in County Longford and the French surrendered to become prisoners of war. Fortunately the diary of a James Ryan who was a land surveyor and present in Carrick in 1798 has survived and is held in the Waterford County Museum. This records that the Dorset Militia arrived on the 12th of September, 1798 and remained there until Michaelmas day [September 29]. One of their tasks appears to have been to search Carrick for arms but they only appear to have located rusty old guns and swords. They were despatched to Fermoy and Kerrick, which are North of Cork, but were back in Carrick on Shannon by October 22. For some time there were local uprisings or disturbances but only one is recorded involving the Dorset Militia and that was at Coolnamuck where a number of prisoners had been taken. Intelligence having been received that there was going to be trouble, a Mr Jephson preceded with a force of Yeomen [cavalry] assisted by the Dorset Militia to Coolnamuck and took into custody seven persons on 6 September 1799. That night about 300 people assembled and during the ensuing disturbances another nine were taken into custody. Things generally quietened down however and there was no longer a need for such large numbers [approx 100,000] so the Militia, including the Devon and Dorset contingents, returned to England in 1799. The Churchwarden accounts show that they returned to Fordington and were discharged from the Militia on 1 November 1799.

In 1814 the Dorset Militia were listed as serving in Ireland (along with other county militias) with the following as command group:

 Colonel Richard Bingham (appointed as colonel in 1799)
 Lieutenant Colonel Richard T Steward
 Major Nathaniel T Still

The Dorset Militia was wound down and disembodied at the end of the Napoleonic Wars – surviving with barely any staff, as was the case with most of the county militias; although recalled briefly in 1830 to contain the spread of the Swing Riots; which never really affected Dorset.

In 1842 & 1843 Hart's Army Lists record the Dorset Militia as disembodied (not active) with its honorary colonel as Edward the 2nd Earl of Rigby; the Adjutant was listed as Captain G Wyatt. It was based at Dorchester.

However, with the elevation of Napoleon III as Emperor in 1851 Britain again feared French continental adventurism (particularly in Belgium) and county militias were remobilised. In 1852 Dorset was expected to raise a militia of 506; augmented in 1853 with a further 308 men. This mobilisation prompted a change in unit command and Richard Hippisley Bingham became Colonel, relieving the Dorset Militia's former colonel Sir John James Smith, Bart on 26 July 1852.

In 1881 (in common with all militias in Britain) the Dorset Militia ceased to exist as a unique unit. It became the 3rd Battalion the Dorset Regiment.

Battle honours
The Dorset Militia was called out on active service during the Armada of 1779, serving along the coastline of Britain building earthworks and defenses.

Unlike many militia units as well as funnelling reinforcements to its associated regiment on overseas operations in the late Georgian and Victorian Eras, the unit did deploy to Ireland in the late 18th Century. The Times of 1 September 1798 reported that the Dorset and Devon Militias deployed aboard the frigate  to join a force that was opposing a French landing in support of the Irish Rebellion of 1798.

Regimental museum
The Dorset Regiment Museum and that of its militia units was located at The Keep Museum in Dorchester.

See also

 Militia (Great Britain)
 Dorset Regiment
 The Keep, Dorchester

References

External links 
The Keep Museum, Dorchester

Military units and formations in Dorset
Militia of the United Kingdom
Military units and formations established in 1757
Military units and formations disestablished in 1881
Dorset Regiment